Albert William Leslie "Bert" Lucas (3 April 1922 – 21 February 1988) was an Australian rules footballer who played with Carlton and South Melbourne in the Victorian Football League (VFL).

Lucas had his early career interrupted by the war but managed seven appearances for Carlton in the 1944 VFL season.  A ruckman, he played five seasons at South Melbourne and was joined at the club by his brother George in 1947. He took over from Jack Graham as South Melbourne captain in 1949 but held the position for just one year.

He left South Melbourne in 1951 to become captain-coach of Tasmanian club Sandy Bay. In 1954 he returned to Victoria, as playing coach of Nathalia.

References

External links 

1922 births
Carlton Football Club players
Sydney Swans players
Sandringham Football Club players
Sandy Bay Football Club players
Sandy Bay Football Club coaches
Nathalia Football Club players
Royal Australian Air Force personnel of World War II
Australian rules footballers from Melbourne
1988 deaths